, is a regional commuter airline with its headquarters in the Terminal Building in Osaka International Airport near Toyonaka, Osaka Prefecture, Japan and its main hub at Osaka International Airport. J-Air previously had its headquarters in Nagoya, Aichi Prefecture. Its operations include scheduled passenger services to 17 destinations across regional Japan, under Japan Airlines flight numbers. The airline has a fleet of 35 aircraft, consisting of Embraer 170s and Embraer 190s linking tier-two and tier-three cities in Japan as to bypass JAL's congested hub in Tokyo (both Narita and Haneda).

J-Air is a wholly owned subsidiary of Japan's flag carrier, Japan Airlines (JAL) and an affiliate member of the Oneworld alliance. The airline was founded on August 8, 1996, when JAL restructured JAL Flight Academy and J-Air was separated; and began operations as a separate entity from Hiroshima-Nishi Airport on November 1. Faced with limited opportunities for route expansion at Hiroshima, the airline relocated to its new home at Nagoya Airfield, after the opening of Chūbu Centrair International Airport, on February 17, 2005. In the fiscal year ended March 31, 1999, J-Air, together with its sister airlines within the JAL Group, carried over 32 million passengers and over 1.1 million tons of cargo and mail.

History 
JAL Flight Academy (JFA) was established by Japan Airlines (JAL) in August 1989, as a flight training school subsidiary based at Omura Airport, Nagasaki. It provided conversion training for its flight engineers to become pilots. In April 1991, a new division of JFA was created to operate scheduled services to succeed the troubled Nishi Seto Airlink services, a commuter airline serving cities in western Japan. Since the introduction of the 19-seats Jetstream 31s (JS31) in September 1991, the aircraft progressively replaced the Embraer EMB 110 Bandeirante inherited from Nishi Seto.

In August 1996, JAL Flight Academy was restructured, J-Air was separated and established as a wholly owned regional subsidiary airline of Japan Airlines on August 8. On November 1, the airline inaugurated its first flight from Hiroshima-Nishi Airport and was building up service on smaller-demand domestic routes, which larger aircraft could not serve economically. However, the local government subsidy was terminated at the end of the 2000 fiscal year and the airline was required to become self-sufficient. As part of its domestic marketing strategy, JAL found a niche market where the 100-plus-seats Boeing 737s were too large and frequent services were in demand, and began repositioning the airline. Fifty-seats Bombardier CRJ-200s were introduced and progressively replaced the five JS31s until completion in August 2003.

Despite the introduction of the Bombardier CRJ-200s, there were limited opportunities for route expansion from its home at Hiroshima-Nishi Airport. The airline decided to move to Nagoya Airfield, after the opening of Chūbu Centrair International Airport. On February 17, 2005, J-Air realized its dream and relocated to its new home at Nagoya Airfield. In order to strengthen the recognition of the JAL brand and improve customer convenience, the airline disposed its own flight numbers and changed to JAL flight numbers from April 1, 2005.

On April 1, 2007, J-Air, together with four of its sister airlines within the JAL Group, joined Oneworld and became a Oneworld affiliate member. On June 18, JAL signed a purchase agreement with Embraer for ten Embraer 170 jets, with options to acquire another five aircraft. The contract value was worth approximately US$435 million, if all the options are exercised. The aircraft will be used for linking tier-two and tier-three cities in Japan as to bypass the airline’s congested hub in Tokyo. The aircraft was configured to seat 76 passengers in a single-class layout and was designated for J-Air. The first aircraft was delivered on October 3, 2008, received the type certification from the Japan Civil Aviation Bureau (JCAB) on October 27 and operated its first flight in February 2009.

J-Air has been reported by Japanese newspapers and television to be leaving Nagoya Airfield in a phased transition with many flights leaving October 2010 and all flights leaving by end of March 2011.

Destinations 
J-Air operates to the following destinations (as of October 2019):

Fleet

Current Fleet
The J-Air fleet consists of the following aircraft (as of October 2020):

Former Fleet 
Aircraft that have been in service with J-Air are (in alphabetical order):
 Bombardier CRJ200ER
 Embraer EMB 110 Bandeirante
 Jetstream 31

JAL Mileage Bank

See also
 Air transport in Japan
 List of airports in Japan
 List of Japanese companies
 Transport in Japan

References

External links 

  

Airlines established in 1996
Regional airlines of Japan
Companies based in Nagoya
Japan Airlines
Oneworld affiliate members
Japanese companies established in 1996
Japanese brands